Plataraea brunnea is a species of rove beetles native to Europe.

References 

Staphylinidae
Beetles described in 1791
Beetles of Europe